Reinaldo Ramírez (13 May 1935 – 26 July 1996) was a Paraguayan sports shooter. He competed at the 1972 Summer Olympics and the 1976 Summer Olympics.

References

1935 births
1996 deaths
Paraguayan male sport shooters
Olympic shooters of Paraguay
Shooters at the 1972 Summer Olympics
Shooters at the 1976 Summer Olympics
Place of birth missing